Ghost Book is the soundtrack to Turkish horror movie Okul. Kevin Moore made it while he was living in Istanbul, Turkey.

Track listing

2004 albums